O-Solar-Meow is a 1967 Tom and Jerry short (though the year of copyright is 1966) produced by Chuck Jones and directed by Abe Levitow. It was the first space-themed short in the Jones era. The name of short is a pun on "’O sole mio", the 1898 Neapolitan song.

Plot 
A (comparatively) small white ball labeled Supply Satellite No.1 is hit with a very strong spring into space. It falls into a groove running along the outer edge of the roulette wheel-shaped Space Station No.1 until it stops on labelled bay 36. Immediately, "baggage" is deposited out of a machine and one of the packages is a large chunk of cheese, which attracts Jerry who sees this on his monitor and gets in his vehicle, but soon breaks a beam without noticing - this act sets off a rocket, which then sets off a Rube Goldberg machine in order to alert the cat on duty: Tom - he is thrown into his work chair in front of his surveillance monitor and woken up with a stream of water. After seeing Jerry, he signals his robot cat Mechano to chase him.

Mechano attempts to chomp on Jerry's vehicle, but Jerry leaves a stream of exhaust in Mechano's mouth causing a series of repeated coughs. Jerry speeds past Tom who moves his chair to the left but is soon dragged along in the chase. Tom remotely stops Mechano and cruises along the floor without paying attention. He runs into a nearby wall and is temporarily knocked out. He then runs to Mechano and turns him for a rear kick - as a result, all three of Tom's right toes swell red and he hops around in pain.

Tom is then shown testing out a new incisive laser machine on a safe and then a glass water container, which both slice cleanly in half. Tom then cuts out a large portion of the wall containing Jerry's hole, causing him to walk out in bewilderment. He suffers a near miss from the laser and puts on his jetpack and blinds Tom with its smoke. A chase ensues and Jerry cuts Tom in two with the laser. Jerry is hovering in the air and Tom jumps at him, without success, until he realizes that Jerry has cut him in two and then, embarrassed, checks himself into the nearby medical facility.

Tom then puts on an Ajax Flying Belt, which repeatedly backfires: It slips to and drags him by his feet, and then flips over and carries him through the air as if he was being hung by the feet. Tom runs into another wall and then is shown being dragged across the ground by his ankles and then returning to being hung by the feet. Tom blocks the airflow but soon falls down. Tom points the jet stream down and floats in the air next to Jerry, who starts laughing. Tom bites at and then starts chasing him, but instead of biting Jerry on the second try, he bites a pipe and spins around again in an exercise wheel. Jerry stops the spinning with a rod and Tom falls down again.

Jerry is then shown cruising through the air and then spots Tom behind him. He continues on his course but pulls up just in front of a fast-rotating fan, leaving Tom to fall in and be shredded. He falls out with a striped appearance. The belt starts flying by itself in the air until Tom squirts it with gas and stops it from working again. Tom then laughs himself silly.

The wheel of cheese is then shown being propelled through the air. Jerry is inside, about to dine on a tiny bit of cheese (flying the cheese wheel via his jet pack facing backwards at a hole), when Tom shoots a harpoon into and pins the wheel to a wall. Jerry finds himself looking down the barrel of a gun and forced to surrender. Tom places him inside a large, powerful cannon and fires Jerry to the Moon. He celebrates with scattered gunshots, revealed to create holes in anything it hits, puncturing the hull of the space station and causing it to lose air. Tom is then shown being pressed into patching up the holes he has made and re-inflating the space station as an angry space military police officer points a gun at him, threatening to blast him if Tom shows insubordination during this penalty. The short ends with Jerry at a cheese planet eating, Tom's act of firing him away from the station having unexpected benefits.

Crew 
 Animation: Ken Harris, Don Towsley, Tom Ray, Dick Thompson, & Ben Washam.
 Layouts: Don Morgan
 Backgrounds: Philip DeGuard
 Vocal Effects: Mel Blanc & June Foray
 Story: John Dunn
 Music: Eugene Poddany
 Design Consultant: Maurice Noble
 Production Supervised by Les Goldman
 Produced by Chuck Jones
 Directed by Abe Levitow

See also 
Rotating wheel space station

External links 
 
 

1967 animated films
1967 films
1967 short films
Films directed by Abe Levitow
Films scored by Eugene Poddany
Tom and Jerry short films
1960s American animated films
1960s science fiction comedy films
Films set in the future
Animated films without speech
Animated films about robots
Animated films about extraterrestrial life
Moon in film
Metro-Goldwyn-Mayer short films
Metro-Goldwyn-Mayer animated short films
American science fiction comedy films
American robot films
1967 comedy films
MGM Animation/Visual Arts short films
1960s English-language films